The MTV Movie Awards Mexico 2002 was hosted by Regina Orozco.

Winners and Nominees

Favorite Movie - México
Corazones rotos
De la calle
Nadie te oye: Perfume de violetas
Piedras verdes
Y Tu Mamá También

Favorite Movie - Chile
El Leyton
La Fiebre del Loco
Taxi para tres
Te Amo, Made in Chile
Un Ladron y su Mujer

Favorite Movie - Argentina
Déjala correr
El Descanso
La Ciénaga
La Fuga
Sólo por hoy

Best Song from a Movie
"Acaríciame" — Julieta Venegas (Demasiado amor)
"De La Calle" — Ely Guerra (De la calle)
"Déjame Si Estoy Llorando" — El Gran Silencio (Piedras verdes)
"Here Comes The Mayo" — Molotov (Y Tu Mamá También)
"Olvidemos El Romance (Cojamos Ya)" — Lost Acapulco (Nadie te oye: Perfume de violetas)

Best Mexican Talent Drain Abroad
Carlos Bolado - Promises (co-director) 
Emmanuel Lubezki - Ali (cinematographer) 
Guillermo del Toro - El Espinazo Del Diablo (director)
Guillermo del Toro - Blade II (director)
Salma Hayek - Hotel (actress)

Best Kiss
Diego Luna and Maribel Verdú - Y Tu Mamá También 
Gael García Bernal and Diego Luna - Y Tu Mamá También
Gael García Bernal and Maribel Verdú - Y Tu Mamá También
Luis Fernando Peña and Maya Zapata  - De la calle
Pablo Delgado and Ximena Ayala - Nadie te oye: Perfume de violetas

Best Insult
Diego Luna and Gael García Bernal - Y Tu Mamá También
Gabriela Canudas - Demasiado amor
Marta Navarro - Corazones rotos
Ximena Ayala - Nadie te oye: Perfume de violetas

Sexiest Woman
Bárbara Mori - Inspiración 
Claudia Ramírez - De la calle
Lorena Rojas - Corazones rotos
Maribel Verdú - Y Tu Mamá También
Salma Hayek - Y Tu Mamá También

Baddest Mon
Ana Martín - Corazones rotos
Arcelia Ramírez - Nadie te oye: Perfume de violetas 
Diana Bracho - Y Tu Mamá También
Luis Felipe Tovar - De la calle 
María Rojo - Nadie te oye: Perfume de violetas

MTV Movie & TV Awards